The West Valley Demonstration Project is a nuclear waste remediation site in West Valley, New York in the U.S. state of New York. The project focuses on the cleanup and containment of radioactive waste left behind after the abandonment of a commercial nuclear fuel reprocessing plant in 1980. The project was created by an Act of Congress in 1980 and is directed to be a cooperative effort between the United States Department of Energy and the New York State Energy Research and Development Authority.

Despite over 30 years of cleanup efforts and billions of dollars having been spent at the site, the West Valley Demonstration Project property was described as "arguably Western New York's most toxic location" in 2013.

History

1965 to 1980: Commercial operations by Nuclear Fuel Services, Inc.
The State of New York acquired  of land in the Town of Ashford, near West Valley, in 1961 with the intention of developing an atomic industrial area. The property was named the Western New York Nuclear Service Center and would eventually host a commercial spent nuclear fuel reprocessing plant and low-level radioactive waste disposal site that was operated by Nuclear Fuel Services, Inc.

Nuclear Fuel Services was a subsidiary of the W.R. Grace Company in 1963, when the Atomic Energy Commission granted the company the necessary permits to reprocess spent fuel at the West Valley site. The first shipments of spent fuel arrived at the site in 1965, and reprocessing began the next year. In 1969, Nuclear Fuel Services was acquired by Getty Oil.

The plant reprocessed spent reactor fuel at the site from 1966 to 1972. Most of the recovered uranium was depleted or slightly enriched; only  was highly enriched.

After reprocessing operations ceased in 1972, Nuclear Fuel Services continued to accept low-level radioactive waste for disposal at the site until it was discovered that contaminated water was leaking from the trenches. Nuclear Fuel Services was unable to obtain regulatory approval to remove and treat the contaminated water, and stopped accepting waste for burial in 1975.

Escalating regulation required plant modifications which were deemed uneconomic by Nuclear Fuel Services, who ceased all operations at the facility in 1976. After Nuclear Fuel Services' lease expired in 1980, the site and its accumulated waste became the responsibility of New York State.

The former plant remains the only privately owned nuclear fuel reprocessing center to have ever operated in the United States. Two additional private nuclear fuel reprocessing plants were constructed (one by General Electric in Morris, Illinois, and another by Allied General Nuclear Services in Barnwell, South Carolina), but were never permitted to operate. Other reprocessing plants in the United States have been operated by the U.S. Department of Energy rather than private companies.

1980 to present: U.S. Department of Energy's West Valley Demonstration Project
The West Valley Demonstration Project Act (Public Law 96-368) was passed by the United States Congress in 1980, and directed the United States Department of Energy to lead the task of solidifying and removing the accumulated nuclear waste present on the site, in addition to decontaminating and decommissioning the facility and surrounding property. The processes used to solidify and contain the site's nuclear waste were intended to demonstrate strategies that could be used at other cleanup sites.

On October 1, 1980, the U.S. Department of Energy entered into a cooperative agreement with the New York State Energy Research and Development Authority to determine an operational framework for cleanup activities at the site. It also stipulated that the U.S. Federal Government would pay for 90% of the project's costs, with New York State paying the remainder.

Site operations began in February 1982, after West Valley Nuclear Services Company, Inc. (then a subsidiary of Westinghouse Electric Corporation) was chosen by the USDOE as the primary contractor for work to be done at the West Valley Demonstration Project.

See also
Nuclear fuel
Nuclear fuel cycle
Sellafield
COGEMA La Hague site

References

External links

 U.S. Department of Energy's West Valley Demonstration Project website
 West Valley Demonstration Project Annual Site Environmental Report for Calendar Year 2013
 1977 Congressional hearing on decommissioning
 WVDP Cooperative Agreement between the U.S. Department of Energy and the New York State Energy Research and Development Agency
 2010 Final Environmental Impact Statement for Decommissioning and/or Long-Term Stewardship at the West Valley Demonstration Project and Western New York Nuclear Service Center
 Entry from the Center for Land Use Interpretation's exhibit "Perpetual Architecture: Uranium Disposal Cells of America"
 1960s film by Nuclear Fuel Services about their West Valley facility
 West Valley Citizen Task Force
 The Coalition on West Valley Wastes

Nuclear reprocessing sites
Nuclear technology in the United States
Buildings and structures in Cattaraugus County, New York
Nuclear fuel infrastructure in the United States
Radioactive waste repositories in the United States
Radioactively contaminated areas